Anna Theodora Chancellor (born 27 April 1965) is a British actress who has received nominations for BAFTA and Olivier Awards.

Background and early life
Chancellor was born in Richmond, England to barrister John Paget Chancellor, eldest son of Sir Christopher Chancellor, and Mary Jolliffe, a daughter of Lord Hylton. The Chancellor family were Scottish gentry who had owned land at Quothquan since 1432.

Chancellor was brought up in Somerset and educated at St Mary's School, Shaftesbury, which was a Roman Catholic boarding school for girls in Dorset, but left at sixteen to live in London, later describing her early years there as "quite wild". In her early twenties she married the poet Jock Scot (1952–2016), with whom she had a daughter in 1988 while still studying at the London Academy of Music and Dramatic Art. She separated from Scot a few years later. She got her first acting role on television playing Mercedes Page in Jupiter Moon, a BSkyB soap, then came a commercial for Boddingtons beer and a part in the film Four Weddings and a Funeral (1994), playing Henrietta (nicknamed "Duckface") opposite Hugh Grant.

Chancellor is a niece of the journalist Alexander Chancellor, a great-granddaughter of Raymond Asquith (son of the liberal prime minister H. H. Asquith), a first cousin of both the actress Dolly Wells and the model Cecilia Chancellor, a second cousin of the actress Helena Bonham Carter, and the great niece of Jane Austen eight generations removed. Chancellor herself has spoken of her lineage, stating:

Career
Chancellor played Julia Piper in series 1 to 3 of Kavanagh QC. She also played Caroline Bingley in the 1995 BBC adaptation of Pride and Prejudice, and Questular Rontok in The Hitchhiker's Guide to the Galaxy (2005). The same year, she joined the cast of BBC One television drama series Spooks as Juliet Shaw. She has also appeared in The Vice, Karaoke, Cold Lazarus, The Dreamers, Tipping the Velvet and Fortysomething, and had a leading role in the satirical black comedy Suburban Shootout. In 2011, she took a supporting role in the BBC thriller serial The Hour, for which she was nominated for the British Academy Television Award for Best Supporting Actress.

In 1997, she was nominated for the Laurence Olivier Award for Best Actress in a Supporting Role for her performance in Stanley, and in 2013 she was nominated for the Laurence Olivier Award for Best Actress for her part in Private Lives.

Charity
She is a patron of the London children's charity Scene & Heard.

Filmography

Film

Television

Theatre
 Boston Marriage, Donmar Warehouse – March–April 2001; Donmar in the West End – November 2001–February 2002
 Mammals at the Oxford Playhouse and touring – Lorna, January 2006
 Never So Good, National Theatre – summer 2008
 The Observer, National Theatre – spring 2009
 The Last of the Duchess, Hampstead Theatre – October–November 2011
 Private Lives (playing Amanda), Chichester Festival Theatre, September 2012, and the Gielgud Theatre, London (July–September 2013)
 The Wolf From the Door, Royal Court Theatre, September–November 2014
 The Seagull by Anton Chekhov at National Theatre – summer 2016

Audiobooks
Chancellor has played the role of Ann Smiley in BBC dramatisations of the John le Carré novels Call for the Dead, Tinker Tailor Soldier Spy, The Honourable Schoolboy and Smiley's People.

References

External links

Anna Chancellor at the bbc.co.uk official Spooks website
The Anna Chancellor Page
Anna Chancellor sponsored video interview at The Huffington Post

Living people
1965 births
20th-century English actresses
21st-century English actresses
Actresses from London
Actresses from Somerset
Asquith family
English film actresses
English radio actresses
English stage actresses
English television actresses
People educated at St Mary's School, Shaftesbury
People from Richmond, London